Benghazi Governorate was one of the governorates (muhafazah) of Libya from 1963 to 1983. It was created out of the Cyrenaica province. Its capital was the town of Benghazi.
Beida Governorate – east
Misrata Governorate – west
Sebha Governorate – west
Ubari Governorate – west

See also
 Benghazi Province

Notes

Governorates of Libya
Benghazi